My Dear Family is an album by jazz pianist Mal Waldron recorded in 1993 and released on the Evidence label.

Reception
The Allmusic review by Matt Collar states "this is a superbly performed album by stellar, world-class musicians and should please most hardcore jazz fans."

Track listing

 "Footprints" (Wayne Shorter) — 4:48 
 "Left Alone" (Billie Holiday, Mal Waldron) — 8:18 
 "Sassy" (Mal Waldron) — 4:02 
 "Sakura Sakura (Cherry Blossom)" (Traditional) — 9:04 
 "Here's That Rainy Day" (Johnny Burke, Jimmy Van Heusen) — 7:44 
 "Jean-Pierre" (Miles Davis) — 6:30 
 "Red Shoes" (Ujo Noguchi) — 7:59 
 "My Dear Family" (Mal Waldron) — 5:19 
Recorded in New York City on September 21 & 24, 1993

Personnel 
 Mal Waldron — piano
 Eddie Henderson — trumpet, flugelhorn (tracks 1, 3, 4 & 6-8)
 Grover Washington Jr. — soprano saxophone (tracks 1, 2 & 5)
 Reggie Workman — bass
 Pheeroan akLaff — drums

References 

1994 albums
Mal Waldron albums
Evidence Music albums